Donald Harrington, Donald Harington, 'Don Harrington, or Don Harington may refer to:

Donald J. Harrington (born 1945), former president of St. John's University
Donald S. Harrington (1914–2005), New York politician and religious leader
Donald Harington (writer) (1935–2009), American author
Donald Harrington (diplomat), American ambassador

See also
Don Harrington Discovery Center in Amarillo, Texas